CAAF is an abbreviation that may mean:

 Caaf Water, a river in western Scotland
 Česká asociace amerického fotbalu (ČAAF), organizers of the Czech League of American Football
 Children Affected by AIDS Foundation
 Civil Aviation Authority of Fiji
 Courtland Army Airfield
 United States Court of Appeals for the Armed Forces
 Coalition Against Ad Fraud